USS Griffin (AS-13), originally Mormacpenn, a United States Maritime Commission Type C3 pre-war cargo ship, was launched by Sun Shipbuilding & Dry Dock, Chester, Pennsylvania, 11 October 1939. She served briefly with Moore-McConnack, Inc., was acquired by the Navy in 1940, renamed Griffin (AS-13) and converted to a submarine tender at Robbins Dry Dock and Repair Company, Brooklyn, N.Y. Griffin commissioned 31 July 1941.

Her conversion completed in September 1941, Griffin conducted shakedown off the East Coast and sailed with a sub squadron to Newfoundland 22 November 1941. Recalled to Newport, Rhode Island, after Pearl Harbor, the ship was assigned to the United States Pacific Fleet, and departed 14 February 1942 for Australia.

Griffin arrived Brisbane 15 April 1942 to tend Submarine Squadron 5. Early in the war, the United States developed a major submarine base in Australia; and submarines tended by Griffin struck hard at Japanese shipping while surface forces strengthened themselves for the first Pacific offensives. During this period Griffin also repaired merchant ships at a time of great need. The tender departed Brisbane for the Fiji Islands 11 November 1942 and 1 December 1942 sailed to Bora Bora to escort Submarine Division 53 to the Panama Canal Zone. Arriving Balboa 7 January 1943, Griffin continued north to Oakland, California, arriving 20 January 1943.

After repairs at San Diego, California, Griffin again departed for the Pacific, sailing 27 April 1943. She arrived Pearl Harbor 4 May 1943 to take up her vital support duties, and remained until 3 January 1944. The ship performed refits, battle repairs, and general upkeep on submarines before sailing to Mare Island to arrive 10 January 1944.

Griffin returned to Pearl Harbor 17 March 1944, and departed 8 April 1944 for the great submarine base at Fremantle, Western Australia. She arrived 8 May and immediately set about servicing the growing submarine fleet. The tender remained at Fremantle until 20 November 1944, during her Stay founding a rubber fabrication shop which solved one of the great shortages on board the submarines. She then moved closer to the Japanese shipping lanes at Mios Woendi, New Guinea, arriving 9 December 1944. There she tended submarines, surface craft of all kinds, and even lent her repair equipment to shore facilities. Griffin remained at Mios Woendi until 1 February 1945 when she sailed for Subic Bay, via Leyte.

Arriving 10 February 1945, Griffin set up one of the initial submarine repair facilities in the Philippines since 1942. She also helped to salvage damaged destroyer . Shifting base, the tender sailed 22 March 1945 via Leyte, and arrived in the Hawaiian Islands 10 April 1945. After a brief stay at Pearl she departed 10 May 1945 for Midway, arrived 4 days later, and set up another repair facility for submarines. By that time submarines supported by Griffin had practically annihilated Japanese merchant shipping and had played a decisive role in the great Pacific offensive. She remained at Midway until 10 September 1945, then sailed to Pearl Harbor and San Francisco, entering the bay 24 September. Decommissioned at Mare Island 12 October 1945, the ship was placed in reserve. Later she transferred to the Stockton group, Pacific Reserve Fleet, where she remained in reserve, in service, tending reserve submarines, until at least 1967.

She was stricken in 1972 and transferred to MARAD. She was sold in 1973.

References

External links

NavSource.org USS Griffin

 

Type C3 ships
1939 ships
Griffin-class submarine tenders
Ships built by the Sun Shipbuilding & Drydock Company
Submarine tenders
United States Navy
World War II auxiliary ships of the United States